Notable people who share the name Michael Wade or close variants include:

Michael Wade
 Michael Wade (Canadian actor) (1944–2004), Canadian actor, writer, musician
 Michael Wade (rugby union) (born 1937), English rugby union player
 Michael Wade (Trafalgar Park) (born 1954), British politician
 Michael J. Wade (20th century), American academic biologist
Mickey Wade
 Mickey Wade (21st century), musician credited on the American albums Letters and Seasons
Mike Wade
 Mike Wade (20th century), guitarist and band leader for the original Australian cast recording of Jesus Christ Superstar